For the Rest of My Life is a song by Robin Thicke

For the Rest of My Life may also refer to:
"For The Rest of My Life", song by Gary Numan from Dead Moon Falling
"For The Rest of My Life", song by Steve Augeri 2013
"For The Rest of My Life", song by Dakota Staton Rose Marie McCoy, Charles Singleton	1955
"For The Rest of My Life", song by Donna Fargo	Fargo 1979
"For The Rest of My Life", song by Eugene Church and The Fellows, Church, Williams 	1959
"For The Rest of My Life", song by Richard Kerr	Kerr, Peel 1969
"For The Rest of My Life (Dedicate All' Amore)", by	Dionne Warwick Curtis, Carraresi, Pace	1968